The 18th Ohio Infantry Regiment was an infantry regiment in the Union Army during the American Civil War.

Service

Three-months regiment
Companies A, C, and E enrolled at Ironton, Ohio, on April 22, 1861. Company B enrolled at Marietta, Ohio, on April 27, 1861. Company D enrolled at McArthur, Ohio, on April 18, 1861. Company F enrolled at Gallipolis, Ohio, on April 22, 1861. Company I enrolled at Jackson, Ohio, on April 24. And Company K enrolled at Beverly, Ohio, on April 23, 1861.

The 18th Ohio Infantry Regiment organized at Parkersburg, Virginia, and mustered in May 29, 1861, under Colonel Timothy Robbins Stanley in response to President Lincoln's call for 75,000 volunteers.  Companies were sent to different points on the Baltimore & Ohio Railroad to guard the railroad and trains between Parkersburg and Clarksburg, West Virginia (then Virginia), until August.

The regiment mustered out at Columbus, Ohio, on August 28, 1861.

Three-years regiment
The 18th Ohio Infantry was reorganized in Athens, Ohio, August 16-September 28, 1861.  The regiment moved to Camp Dennison near Cincinnati, Ohio, and mustered in for three years service on November 4, 1861, under the command of Colonel Timothy R. Stanley.

The regiment was attached to 8th Brigade, Army of the Ohio to December 1861. 8th Brigade, 3rd Division, Army of the Ohio, to July 1862. Unattached, Railroad Guard, Army of the Ohio, to September 1862. 29th Brigade, 8th Division, Army of the Ohio, to November 1862. 2nd Brigade, 2nd Division, Center, XIV Corps, Army of the Cumberland, to January 1863. 2nd Brigade, 2nd Division, XIV Corps, to October 1863. 2nd Brigade, 1st Division, XIV Corps, to November 1863. Engineer Brigade, Department of the Cumberland, to November 1864.

The 18th Ohio Infantry mustered out of service at Augusta, Georgia, on October 22, 1865.

Detailed service
Moved to Louisville, Ky., November 6, thence to Elizabethtown, Ky., November 15.  Duty at Elizabethtown and Bacon Creek, Ky., November 1861 to February 1862. Advance on Bowling Green, Ky., February 10–15, and on Nashville, Tenn., February 18–25. Occupation of Nashville, Tenn., February 25-March 18. Reconnaissance to Shelbyville, Tullahoma and McMinnville March 25–28. To Fayetteville April 7. Expedition to Huntsville, Ala., April 10–11. Capture of Huntsville April 11. Advance on and capture of Decatur April 11–14. Operations near Athens, Limestone Bridge, Mooresville and Elk River May 1–2. Near Pulaski and near Bridgeport May 1. Moved to Fayetteville May 31. Negley's Expedition to Chattanooga June 1–15. At Battle Creek until July 11. Guard duty along Tennessee & Alabama Railroad from Tullahoma to McMinnville until September. Short Mountain Road and McMinnville August 29 (Companies A and I). Retreat to Nashville, Tenn. Siege of Nashville September 12-November 7. Near Lavergne October 7. Duty at Nashville until December 26. Advance on Murfreesboro December 26–30. Battle of Stones River December 30–31, 1862 and January 1–3, 1863. Duty at Murfreesboro until June. Tullahoma Campaign June 23-July 7. Occupation of middle Tennessee until August 16. Passage of Cumberland Mountains and Tennessee River and Chickamauga Campaign August 16-September 22. Davis Cross Roads or Dug Gap September 11. Battle of Chickamauga September 19 21. Rossville Gap September 21. Siege of Chattanooga, Tenn., September 24-November 23. Reopening Tennessee River October 26–29. Brown's Ferry October 27. Chattanooga-Ringgold Campaign November 23–27. Orchard Knob November 23–24. Missionary Ridge November 25. Engaged in engineer duty at Chattanooga until October 20, 1864.

Casualties
The regiment lost a total of 184 men during service; 4 officers and 72 enlisted men killed or mortally wounded, 1 officer and 107 enlisted men died of disease.

Commanders
 Colonel Timothy Robbins Stanley
 Lieutenant Colonel Josiah Given - commanded at the battle of Stones River
 Lieutenant Colonel Charles H. Grosvenor - commanded at the battle of Chickamauga

See also

 List of Ohio Civil War units
 Ohio in the Civil War

References
 Booth, John T. Another Day in Lincoln's Army: The Civil War Journals of Sgt. John T. Booth (New York: iUniverse, Inc.), 2007.  
 Dyer, Frederick H. A Compendium of the War of the Rebellion (Des Moines, IA:  Dyer Pub. Co.), 1908.
 Ohio Roster Commission. Official Roster of the Soldiers of the State of Ohio in the War on the Rebellion, 1861–1865, Compiled Under the Direction of the Roster Commission (Akron, OH: Werner Co.), 1886–1895.
 Palmer, Jewett and John T. Booth. Historical Sketch of Company "B," Eighteenth Regiment Ohio Volunteer Infantry: Three months Service, Fifty Years from the Date of Enlistment, April 22, 1861-April 22, 1911 (Marietta, OH: The Authors), 1911.
 Reid, Whitelaw. Ohio in the War: Her Statesmen, Her Generals, and Soldiers (Cincinnati, OH: Moore, Wilstach, & Baldwin), 1868. 
Attribution

External links
 Ohio in the Civil War: 18th Ohio Volunteer Infantry by Larry Stevens
 National flag of the 18th Ohio Volunteer Infantry
 Regimental flag of the 18th Ohio Infantry
 National flag of the 18th Ohio Volunteer Infantry, probably the first
 Regimental flag of the 18th Ohio Veteran Volunteer Infantry, probably the first

Military units and formations established in 1861
Military units and formations disestablished in 1864
1864 disestablishments in Ohio
Units and formations of the Union Army from Ohio
1861 establishments in Ohio